Bryan Township is a township in Griggs County, North Dakota, United States.

History
Twenty two persons submitted a petition for the incorporation of Township 147 Range 61 on August 13, 1900 and the County Commission ordered an election to be held on September 4, 1900 to elect officers.  Ole Bakken suggested the township be named after William Jennings Bryan.

Demographics
Its population during the 2010 census was 39.

Location within Griggs County
Bryan Township is located in Township 147 Range 61 west of the Fifth principal meridian.

References

Townships in Griggs County, North Dakota